= Embassy of Germany, Baghdad =

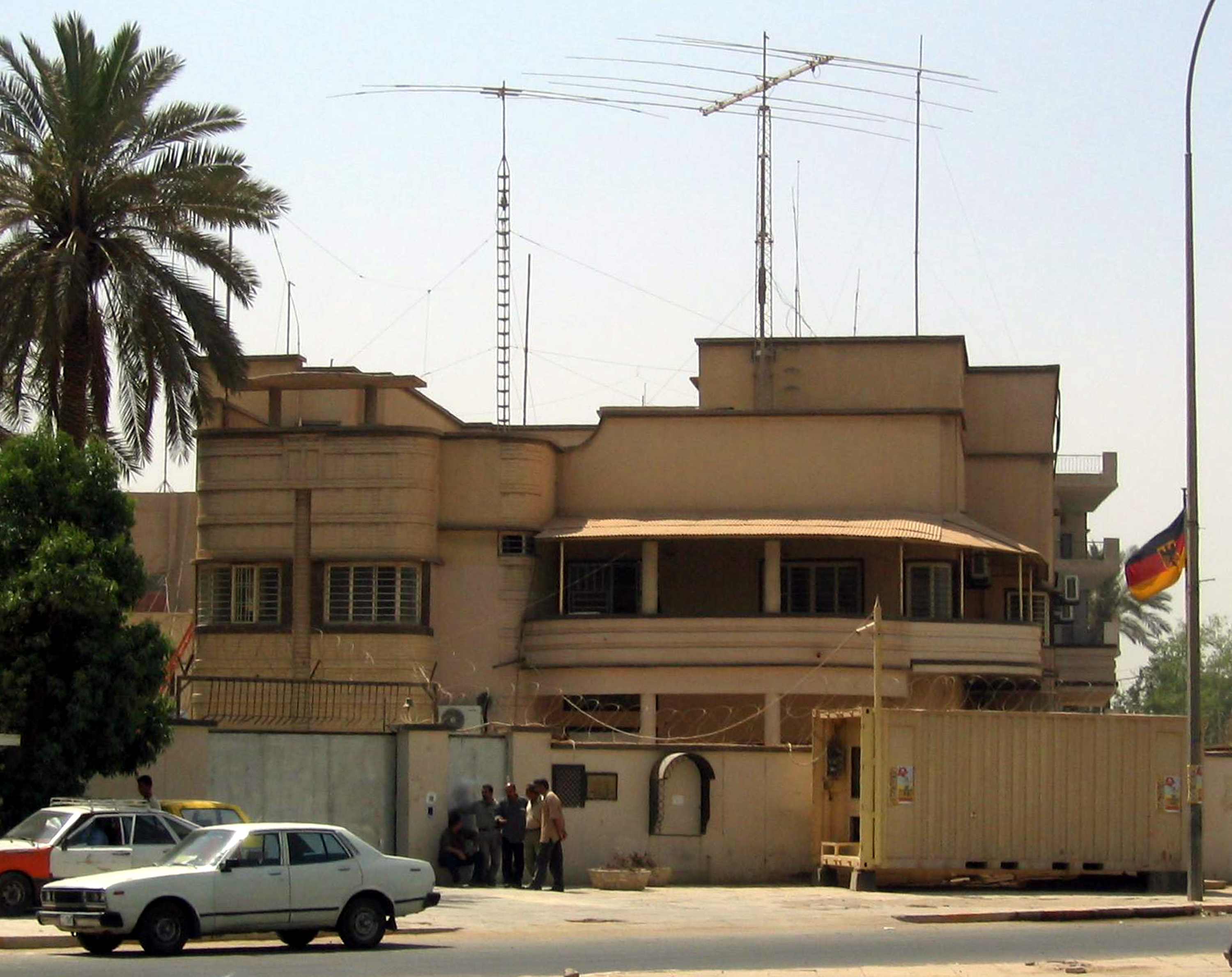
German Embassy Baghdad, Iraq

The Embassy of Germany in Bagdad is the diplomatic mission of the Federal Republic of Germany in Iraq. In addition, the Consulate General is working in Erbil as the second German representation in the Kurdistan Region in the north of the country. The embassy Baghdad is located in the district of Jadriyah. Ambassador is Ole Diehl.

The Federal Intelligence Service has an office at the Embassy in Baghdad and the Consulate General in Erbil.
